Fortunato Luis Pacavira (born 27 July 1978) is an Angolan sprint canoer who competed in the late 2000s. At the 2008 Summer Olympics in Beijing, he was eliminated in the heats of the C-1 500 m event and the semifinals of the C-1 1000 m event.  At the 2012 Summer Olympics, he was eliminated in the semi-final of the C-1 1000 m event, and in the semi-final of the C-2 1000 m event, where he competed with Nelson Henriques.

References

External links
 

1978 births
Angolan male canoeists
Canoeists at the 2008 Summer Olympics
Canoeists at the 2012 Summer Olympics
Living people
Olympic canoeists of Angola
African Games silver medalists for Angola
African Games medalists in canoeing
Competitors at the 2011 All-Africa Games